The Anton Bruckner Prize is the main Culture Prize of the Province of Upper Austria (Kulturpreis des Landes Oberösterreich) for music. The prize, which is awarded by the Land of Upper Austria, is named after the composer Anton Bruckner, who was cathedral organist in Linz from 1855 to 1868. The award is endowed with 11,000 euros and is presented in a ceremony in Linz.

Laureates before 1989 
(incomplete)
 1962: Johann Nepomuk David
 1964: Isidor Stögbauer
 1966: Helmut Eder
 1972: Josef Friedrich Doppelbauer

Grand Prize winners since 1989 
 1993: Augustinus Franz Kropfreiter.
 1996: Balduin Sulzer.
 2001: Alfred Peschek.
 2003: Fridolin Dallinger.
 2010: Ernst Ludwig Leitner.
 2016: Gunter Waldek.

References 

Austrian music awards
Anton Bruckner